Onwards is the first studio album from the Norwegian heavy metal band Triosphere.  It was released in Norway in 2006 by FaceFront Records and the rest of Europe in 2007 by Plastic Head Distribution. The Japanese label Spiritual Beast released the album in Asia in 2006 and in the United States in 2007.

Track listing

Reception 

The album has received positive reviews from metal review sites and the specialized press. In August 2009, Onwards receives the award for Metal album of the Year from "Just Plain Folks Music Organization", world's largest independent music organization, in competition with more than 40.000 artists in all genres around the world.

Personnel

Band members
 Ida Haukland - vocals and bass
 Marius Silver Bergesen - lead and rhythm guitars
 Ørjan Aare Jørgensen - drums

Additional personnel 
 Arid Følstad - keyboards
 Ann Helen Samnsve - violin and viola
 Espen Godø - mellotron (on 8 and 9)
 Tommy Sebastian - male vocals (on 2 and 10)
 Pete Beck - backing vocals (on 4, 9 and 10) and tambourine

References

External links 
 Official Triosphere website

2006 albums
Triosphere albums